The Battle of Taguanes was fought between Spanish royalists and the Second Republic of Venezuela on 31 July 1813 during the Admirable Campaign of the War of Venezuelan Independence. Simon Bolivar and his patriots won the battle handily, defeating the Spanish (and killing their colonel) and eventually capturing Valencia on August 2 and Caracas on August 3.

References

Notes

Bibliography

Conflicts in 1813
Battles of the Venezuelan War of Independence
July 1813 events
1813 in Venezuela